KFIM-LP, known on the air as REAL 102.1, is a low-power FM Christian Music radio station located in Carroll, IA.  The station is a music intensive format and carries the Today's Christian Music offering from the Salem Radio Network. REAL 102.1 also has local information such as the weather forecast and local events. The station was created by the Carroll Impact Educational Association, a non-profit 501(c)(3). KFIM-LP was first licensed on May 1, 2014.

History
KFIM-LP first signed on the air in July 2015 and was created as a ministry and educational outreach of the idea to Carroll Impact Educational Association, a 501 (c)(3) non-profit organization.  
start KFIM-LP came when Ron & Karla Cheney met a gentleman who notified them that the FCC was to open a filing window for low-power FM radio stations in late 2013.  The couple then met with Wes Treadway, knowing that bringing Christian radio to Carroll, Iowa was a goal Wes had.

Staff
The station is governed by a board of directors which originally consisted of President-Ron Cheney, Treasurer-Marchelle Kots, John McLaughlin, Todd Tidgren and Jeff Grote.  Jeff Grote was replaced in 2016 by Marcie Duncan.  Wes Treadway, former KCIM Program Director and Morning Announcer, serves as the station's General Manager on a volunteer basis.

External links
 

Radio stations established in 2015
2015 establishments in Iowa
FIM-LP
Contemporary Christian radio stations in the United States
FIM-LP